Sheykh Mahalleh (also Romanized as Sheykh Maḩalleh; also known as Shaikh-Makhallekh) is a village in Khoshabar Rural District, in the Central District of Rezvanshahr County, Gilan Province, Iran. At the 2006 census, its population was 431, in 108 families.

References 

Populated places in Rezvanshahr County